

See also

São Tomé and Príncipe
Heads of State of São Tomé and Príncipe
Heads of Government of São Tomé and Príncipe
Foreign Ministers of São Tomé and Príncipe
Colonial Heads of São Tomé and Príncipe
Lists of Incumbents

Regional
Government of São Tomé and Príncipe